Huang Ting (born 16 January 1999) is a Chinese weightlifter competing in the −64 kg division.

She currently holds all junior world records in the snatch, clean & jerk and total in the 64 kg category.

Career
She won the 2017 Junior World Weightlifting Championships in the 63 kg division.

She competed at the 5th International Qatar Cup in the 64 kg division, sweeping gold medals in all lifts and setting junior world records in the snatch, clean & jerk and total.

Major results

References

1999 births
Living people
Chinese female weightlifters
21st-century Chinese women